Keith Skillen (26 May 1948 – 7 August 2013) was an English professional footballer who played as a forward.

Career
Born in Cockermouth, Skillen played for Deer Orchard, Netherfield, Workington, Hartlepool United and Cockermouth.

Later life and death
Skillen died on 7 August 2013, at the age of 65, after suffering from motor neurone disease.

References

1948 births
2013 deaths
English footballers
Kendal Town F.C. players
Workington A.F.C. players
Hartlepool United F.C. players
English Football League players
Association football forwards
Deaths from motor neuron disease
Neurological disease deaths in the United Kingdom
People from Cockermouth
Footballers from Cumbria